The Unstoppable Yellow Yeti is an animated television series produced by Zodiak Kids Studios and Gigglebug Entertainment, with the participation of The Walt Disney Company EMEA. The series was created by Anttu Harlin and Joonas Utti, and premiered on Disney Channel in France on May 14, 2022.

The series was later released in Finland on Yle Areena in July 2022, and is scheduled to be released on Disney+ in the UK.

Premise 

In the first episode, 12-year-old surfer boy Osmo is forced to leave his old life behind when he moves with his father to Winterton, a fictional village north of the Arctic Circle, where it snows all year round. Osmo and his cousin Rita meet a yellow yeti, named Gustav, and start to have adventures with him. The village has plenty of strict rules, including a ban on monsters. Rita's father, Roman Chrome, the village mayor, hates monsters. In order to hide from him, Gustav dresses up in different disguises. The series features many Finnish things like ice-swimming, May Day celebrations and crayfish parties, a fast food treat from Lappeenranta and bucket queues.

The main themes of the series are friendship and rebelling against the rules.

Cast 
Gustav (voiced by Trevor Dion Nicholas)
Osmo (voiced by Rasmus Hardiker)
Rita (voiced by Amy-Leigh Hickman)
Mayor Chrome (voiced by Paul Tylak)
Ned (voiced by Christopher Ragland)
Lydia (voiced by Harriet Carmichael)

Production 

Anttu Harlin and Joonas Utti founded their company Gigglebug Entertainment in 2013 and started brainstorming the title character of the series already during the first year of the company's inception.

The following year, they told about their idea to a Disney employee they met in France. They liked the idea and asked to be contacted when it had been refined.

In 2015, Gigglebug Entertainment, Disney EMEA and Zodiak Kids Studios started developing the series together. Later Gigglebug Entertainment collaborated with Disney on the development of 101 Dalmatian Street in 2016, with the show airing in 2019.

The production of true series began in summer 2020 with Utti as chief director and Harlin as executive producer together with Zodiak Kids Studios' CEO Benoit di Sabatino. Lucy Pryke of Gigglebug Entertainment and Gary Milne of Zodiak Kids were appointed as creative producers. Zodiak Kids took international distribution rights for the series. The show was officially announced in October 2020. This was the first time Disney had commissioned an original programme from Finland. The series was produced over the course of two years in Finland, Canada, France and the UK.

The main character in the series has been inspired by Utti's childhood friend Kike. Kike was Costa Rican exchange student who lived at Utti's home in Lappeenranta and who made a big impression on 14-year-old Utti, who considers himself an introvert. Kike broke the Finnish behavioural taboos and taught Utti to see the world from a new perpective. During the brainstorming phase, Gustav was made into a felt-doll and Utti and Harlin joked about yellow snow.

The show initially premiered on Disney Channel in Portugal and in Spain on May 9, 2022, before premiering in France on May 14 of the same year.

The first season consists of 50 11-minute episodes. Each episode is aired in pairs to fit the half-hour timeslots when aired on Disney Channel. The first 20 11-minute episodes were released on Yle Areena on July 1, 2022, with the entire season later being released on Disney+. It is also the first Finnish show for Disney, though the creators had developed 101 Dalmatian Street for a 2019 release.

In the United Kingdom, ZeeToons released clips of the show on YouTube, with two full episodes, "Long Time No Ski" and "Katz", being released on August 9, 2022, and August 16, 2022, respectively. On December 5, 2022, ZeeToons announced that the series would be released on Disney+.

Episodes

Shorts
The first six shorts have been released on Yle Areena on July 1, 2022, and all of them have been written by Giles Pilbrow, storyboarded by Marion Benkaid-Kesba and directed by Samppa Kukkonen.

Notes

References

External links
Disney+: “The Unstoppable Yellow Yeti” Coming Soon
ZeeToons on YouTube: The Unstoppable Yellow Yeti Trailer

Wunschliste: Der fantastische Yellow Yeti

2022 Finnish television series debuts
21st-century Finnish television series
British children's animated comedy television series
Finnish children's animated comedy television series
French children's animated comedy television series
Animated television series about children
Disney Channels Worldwide original programming
Television series by Banijay